Ronald Baecker (born October 7, 1942) is an Emeritus Professor of Computer Science and Bell Chair in Human-Computer Interaction at the University of Toronto (U of T). He was the co-founder of the Dynamic Graphics Project, and is the founder of the Knowledge Media Design Institute (KMDI) and the Technologies for Aging Gracefully Lab (TAGlab). He is the author of Computers and Society: Modern Perspectives, published by Oxford University Press in 2019, co-author of The COVID-19 Solutions Guide published in 2020, and author of the latest independently published Digital Dreams Have Become Nightmares: What We Must Do in 2021.

Education 
He returned to his alma mater to study Computer Science at MIT's Department of Electrical Engineering and received his Ph.D. in June 1969.

Summary of research interests

Baecker is an expert in human-computer interaction (HCI), user interface (UI) design, software visualization, multimedia, computer-supported cooperative work and learning, and entrepreneurship in the software industry.

Baecker founded TAGlab to research the design of technologies for aging gracefully and was a founding researcher in AGE-WELL, Canada's Technology and Aging research network.

Professional career
Between 1995 and 1998, Dr. Baecker founded the Knowledge Media Design Institute at the Faculty of Information at the University of Toronto. This was the first institute at U of T to address interdisciplinary issues within the production, creation, and distribution of knowledge media. 

In 2021, Baecker established Computers and Society. The inaugural board is chaired by Baecker, with Ishtiaque Ahmed, Casey Fiesler, Brett Frischmann, Uma Kalkar, Nicholas Logler, C. Dianne Martin, Dan Shefet and Rebecca Wright as board members.

Honors and awards
 ACM Distinguished Speaker, 1 March 2022 - 28 February 2025.
 Social Impact Award from the ACM Special Interest Group on Computers and Human Interaction (SIGCHI), 2020.
 Lifetime Achievement Award from the Canadian Association of Computer Science/Association d’informatique Canadienne, the national organization of Canadian Computer Science Departments/Schools/Faculties, May 2015.
 Given the 3rd Canadian Digital Media Pioneer Award, GRAND Network of Centres of Excellence, May 2013.
 Elected as an ACM Fellow, November 2011.
 Together with Alex Levy, Aakash Sahney, and Kevin Tonon, second place recipient of the 2011 University of Toronto Inventor of the Year Award in the Information and Computer Technology, Social Sciences and Humanities category, January 2011.
 Awarded the 2007 Leadership Award of Merit from the Ontario Research and Innovation Optical Network (ORION) in June 2007.
 Awarded the Canadian Human Computer Communications Society Achievement Award in May 2005.
 Elected to the ACM SIGCHI CHI Academy in February 2005.

References

American computer scientists
Canadian computer scientists
1942 births
Living people
Fellows of the Association for Computing Machinery
MIT Department of Physics alumni
Academic staff of the University of Toronto
University of Maryland, College Park faculty
Columbia University staff
Massachusetts Institute of Technology staff
American emigrants to Canada
American expatriates in Germany